Sierra Valley is a large mountain valley located west of the crest of California's Sierra Nevada mountain range in Plumas and Sierra Counties, north of Interstate 80.

Geography

The former Lake has the suggested name of Lake Beckwourth and existed until approximately 10,000 years ago. Average annual rainfall is less than twenty inches, most falling as snow. The valley floor has a grassland and sagebrush ecosystem and is the site of extensive freshwater marshes filled with cattails, bulrushes and alkaline flats that drain into the Middle Fork Feather River. Many species of wildlife make their permanent home in the valley, and a great number of migratory bird species stop over in the fall and nest in the valley in the spring. The valley also has thermal activity, with Marble Hot Springs located in the north central valley floor.

Economy
Sierra Valley is an agricultural and livestock region. Tourism also contributes to the local economy.

Access
Entrance from the west is through Yuba Pass on State Route 49. Entrance from the east is through Beckwourth Pass, the lowest mountain pass on the crest of the Sierra Nevada, on State Route 70.  State Route 89 skirts the southern end of the valley. State Route 49, the Gold Rush trail, terminates at State Route 70 in Vinton, and the latter highway then terminates at Hallelujah Junction on U.S. Route 395 after passing through Chilcoot.

Principal towns

Sierraville
Beckwourth
Calpine
Sattley
Loyalton
Vinton
Chilcoot

Sources
A Biological Baseline Study of Sierra Valley Marsh, California 1976. Dept. of Biology, SFSU. NSF SOS grant SMI-76-08071.
This was a student originated study funded by the National Science Foundation to assess biological resources of the high-altitude freshwater marsh in Sierra Valley.   https://archive.org/details/SierraValleyStudy/page/n23

References

External links

Plumas County Visitors Bureau
Plumas National forest
Tahoe National forest

Valleys of California
Wetlands of California
Landforms of Plumas County, California
Landforms of Sierra County, California
Valleys of Plumas County, California
Valleys of Sierra County, California